Kuntur Wamani (Quechua kuntur condor, wamani sternum; xiphoid process; god of the Ch'anka mythology; provinces of the Inca Empire, Hispanicized spellings Condor Huamani, Condor Huamaní) is a mountain in the Chunta mountain range in the Andes of Peru, about  high. It is located in the Huancavelica Region, Castrovirreyna Province, Santa Ana District, and in the Huancavelica Province, Huancavelica District. Kuntur Wamani lies southeast of Wamanrasu, northwest of Qarwarasu and northeast of Antarasu.

References

Mountains of Huancavelica Region
Mountains of Peru